Jordan Zion Wilford Norville-Williams (born 26 January 2000) is an English professional footballer who plays as a full back for Farnborough.

Career
In 2016, Norville-Williams joined Cambridge United from Arsenal after his release from the latter at under-16 level, signing his first professional contract with Cambridge in May 2018. During the 2017–18 season, Norville-Williams had one game loan spells with both Cambridge City and Harlow Town, as well as joining St Neots Town for a seven-game spell, where he scored twice for the club. Norville-Williams began the 2018–19 season on loan at Royston Town, making 11 league appearances, before returning to St Neots again until April 2019. Prior to the 2019–20 season, Norville-Williams signed for Hitchin Town on loan, making six appearances in all competitions. On 12 November 2019, Norville-Williams made his debut for Cambridge United in a 2–1 EFL Trophy defeat against rivals Peterborough United.

In October 2020, Norville-Williams signed for Hayes & Yeading United.

On 1 August 2022, Norville-Williams joined Farnborough following a successful trial period.

Career statistics

References

2000 births
Living people
Association football defenders
English footballers
Cambridge United F.C. players
Cambridge City F.C. players
Harlow Town F.C. players
St Neots Town F.C. players
Royston Town F.C. players
Hitchin Town F.C. players
Hayes & Yeading United F.C. players
Farnborough F.C. players
Isthmian League players
English Football League players
Southern Football League players
Black British sportspeople